Arthur Andrew Hamilton, (1855-1929) was an Australian botanist.

Names published 
Ancistrachne maidenii (A.A.Ham.) Vickery (basionym: Eriochloa maidenii A.A.Ham.: Hamilton, A.A. (1913) A new Species of Eriochloa from the Hawkesbury River. Proceedings of the Linnean Society of New South Wales 37(4): 709.)
 Lepidosperma forsythii A.A.Ham.: Hamilton, A.A. (1910) A new species of Lepidosperma [N.O. Cyperaceae] from the Port Jackson district; with some miscellaneous botanical notes. Proceedings of the Linnean Society of New South Wales 35(2): 411. 
 Lepidosperma quadrangulatum A.A.Ham.:Hamilton, A.A. (1920) Notes from the Botanic Gardens, Sydney. Proceedings of the Linnean Society of New South Wales 45(2): 261.
Prostanthera densa A.A.Ham.: Hamilton, A.A. (1920) Notes from the Botanic Gardens, Sydney. Proceedings of the Linnean Society of New South Wales 45(2): 263.
Prostanthera saxicola var. montana A.A.Ham.: Hamilton, A.A. (1920) Notes from the Botanic Gardens, Sydney. Proceedings of the Linnean Society of New South Wales 45(2): 263. 
Hakea salicifolia subsp. angustifolia (A.A.Ham.) W.R.Barker (basionym: Hakea saligna var. angustifolia A.A.Ham.:Hamilton, A.A. (1920) Notes from the Botanic Gardens, Sydney. Proceedings of the Linnean Society of New South Wales 45(2): 261)
Grevillea punicea var. crassifolia A.A.Ham.: Hamilton, A.A. (1920) Notes from the Botanic Gardens, Sydney. Proceedings of the Linnean Society of New South Wales 45(2): 261
For further names see the International Plant Name Index.

Publications
 (1918) Topographical, ecological, and taxonomic notes on the ocean shoreline vegetation of the Port Jackson district
 (1912) A new Species of Eriochloa from the Hawkesbury River. Proceedings of the Linnean Society of New South Wales 37(4): 709.
 (1910) A new species of Lepidosperma (N.O. Cyperaceae) from the Port Jackson district; with some miscellaneous botanical notes. Proceedings of the Linnean Society of New South Wales 35(2): 411. 
 (1920) Notes from the Botanic Gardens, Sydney. Proceedings of the Linnean Society of New South Wales 45(2): 260-264.

References 

20th-century Australian botanists
1855 births
1929 deaths
19th-century Australian botanists